Sneak or Sneaky may refer to:

 DJ Sneak, Puerto Rican born American house music DJ and producer Carlos Sosa (born 1969)
 Quarterback sneak, an American football play
 Sneak magazine, a British weekly magazine published from 2002 to 2006
 "Sneak" (novel), a 2012 apocalyptic novel by Evan Angler
 Wiley Sneak, a main character on the British children's game show Trapped! (TV series)
 Sneaky (gamer), gamer name of Zachary Scuderi, a professional League of Legends player, streamer, and prominent crossplayer
 Sneaky, a female professional wrestler half of the tag-team Stinky and Sneaky from the Gorgeous Ladies of Wrestling
 Sneaks (musician), stage name used by the artist Eva Moolchan
 Sneaks, a 2020 oil on linen painting by Julia Rommel

See also
"Sneakin'", 2016 song by rappers Drake and 21 Savage
 Sneaking suit
 Sneaking (biology), a strategy that allows males to gain access to a female while avoiding more dominant males
 Sneaky Sneaky